Into Paradise is a 2006 classical/crossover album by Norwegian soprano Sissel Kyrkjebø released in the US, the UK and Japan.

Track listing

UK version
 In Paradisum
 Sancta Maria
 Bachianas Brasileiras
 Dido's Lament
 Wachet auf, ruft uns die Stimme
 Dusk (Velkomne med æra)
 Ingen vinner frem
 What Child Is This?
 Marble Halls
 The Sleeping Princess
 Vitae Lux
 Salley Gardens
 Ave Verum Corpus
 Like an Angel Passing Through My Room

US version
 Dusk
 Bachianas Brasileiras
 Wachet auf, ruft uns die Stimme
 Dido's Lament
 In Paradisum
 Sancta Maria
 Vitae Lux
 Ingen vinner frem
 Bäreden väg för herran
 Marble Halls
 Adagio
 Like an Angel Passing Through My Room

Japan version
 In Paradisum
 Sancta Maria
 Bachianas Brasileiras
 Dido's Lament
 Wachet auf, ruft uns die Stimme
 Dusk (Velkomne med æra)
 Ingen vinner frem
 What Child Is This?
 Marble Halls
 The Sleeping Princess
 Vitae Lux
 Salley Gardens
 Ave Verum Corpus
 Like an Angel Passing Through My Room
 Adagio (Bonus track)

References 
www.sissel.net
www.discogs.com
www.rockipedia.no

Sissel Kyrkjebø albums
2006 albums